Count  was a Japanese bureaucrat, statesman and cabinet minister, active in Meiji- and Taishō-period Japan.

Biography
Yoshikawa was born in Yamakawa, Awa Province (currently Yoshinogawa, Tokushima) as the son of a local samurai. After the Meiji Restoration, he went to Tokyo and entered into service of the new Meiji government, rising to become head of the National Printing Bureau under the Ministry of Finance in 1872.

He was a close protégé of Yamagata Aritomo and at Yamagata's urging, served as Governor of Tokyo from July 1882 to June 1885. As Governor, Yoshikawa submitted a plan for the complete redevelopment of Tokyo based on the redevelopment of Paris under Napoleon III. Yoshikawa's plan called for a system of wide boulevards and canals radiating out from the Tokyo Imperial Palace. He also called for an expansion of the train system to a terminus in an expanded Tokyo Station. Although some elements of the “Yoshikawa Plan” were eventually implemented, most remained on paper due to completing plans raised by other politicians, notably Inoue Kaoru.

Yoshikawa then worked as Deputy Director of the Home Ministry from March 1886 to May 1890. When Yamagata became Prime Minister, Yoshikawa was appointed to his cabinet as Minister of Education, a post which he held from May 1890 to June 1891. Emperor Meiji expressed reservations over the appointment, but was convinced by Yamagata that the choice of the conservative Yoshikawa was suitable. During this period, he played an important role in writing the Imperial Rescript on Education, which articulated government policy on the guiding principles of education in the Empire of Japan, and which had to be memorized by all students.

In 1893, under the 2nd Itō Hirobumi administration, Yoshikawa was appointed Minister of Justice. He continued in the same position through the 2nd Matsukata Masayoshi administration. In February 1896, while still holding the position of Minister of Justice, he was concurrently appointed Home Minister. He also served as a chamberlain in the Imperial Household.

In 1898, under the 1st Ōkuma Shigenobu administration, he was reappointed as Home Minister, and under the 2nd Yamagata administration in November 1898, was made Minister of Communications. That same year, he was elevated to the kazoku peerage with the title of shishaku (viscount).

In 1901, under the 1st Katsura Tarō administration, he was reappointed as Minister of Communications. After his term ended in July 1903, he announced that he would be leaving public service; however, he accepted the post of Home Minister again in February 1904, serving until September 1905. In 1907, he became the 1st chairman of the Japan Society for Prevention of Sexually-transmitted Disease. He was subsequently elevated to hakushaku (count).

In 1912, Yoshikawa became deputy secretary of the Privy Council. However, in 1917, he was forced to resign his positions and retire from public life over a major scandal caused by his 4th daughter Kamako.

Yoshikawa had four daughters but no sons, he adopted a younger son of Sone Arasuke, who married his Yoshikawa's 4th daughter Kamako. The son, Hiroharu, became a prominent businessman. However, Kamako had an affair with her chauffeur, with whom she attempted a double suicide by throwing themselves in front of a train. The chauffeur died instantly, but Kamako survived with serious injuries. The revelation of her adultery across class lines brought vehement condemnation from the press and Yoshikawa's peers, and forced his retirement from public life.

Yoshikawa's birthplace in Yoshinogawa, Tokushima is preserved as a house museum. His grave is located at Aoyama Cemetery in Tokyo.

References 
 Keene, Donald. Emperor Of Japan: Meiji And His World, 1852–1912. Columbia University Press (2005). 
 Franser, Benjamin. Trains, Culture, and Mobility: Riding the Rails. Lexington Books (2001). 
 Fujitani, Takashi. (1998). Splendid Monarchy: Power and Pageantry in Modern Japan.. Berkeley: University of California Press. ; —Reprint edition, 1998. |page 74–75
 Sims, Richard. Japanese Political History Since the Meiji Renovation 1868–2000. Palgrave Macmillan. 
 Sato, Barbara. The New Japanese Woman: Modernity, Media, and Women in Interwar Japan. Duke University Press (2003). .

Notes

External links

Yoshinogawa city home page
National Diet Library Bio and Photo

 
 
 
 
 
 
 
 
 

1842 births
1920 deaths
Government ministers of Japan
Kazoku
People from Tokushima Prefecture
People of Meiji-period Japan
Ministers of Home Affairs of Japan
Governors of Tokyo